Leanne Rivlin (born 1929) is an originator of the Environmental Psychology Doctoral Program at the CUNY Graduate Center in the late 1960s.

Biography

Education
Ph.D., M.A. Teachers College, Columbia University (1953,1957)
B.A. Brooklyn College, Psychology & English (1952)

Career
Professor, Dept. of Psychology, Environmental Psychology PhD Program, The Graduate Center of The City University of New York (1974–present)
Research Associate, Environmental Psychology PhD Program, The Graduate Center of The City University of New York (1970–1974)
Research Associate, Brooklyn College & The Graduate Center, Ward Design Study (1963–1970)
Research Consultant, Hunter College High School, Evaluation of experimental arts program on creativity (1960–1962)
Lecturer, City College, Department of Education (1960)
Research Associate, Horace Mann-Lincoln Institute, Teachers College, Study of creativity in children (1957–1960)
Instructor, Brooklyn College, Department of Psychology (1955–1959)

Publications

Books 
Carr, S., Francis, M. Rivlin, L.G., Stone, A.M. (1992; 1995). Public Space. Cambridge: Cambridge University Press.
Ittelson, W.H., Proshansky, H.M., Rivlin, L.G., Winkel, G.H. (1974). An Introduction to Environmental Psychology. New York: Holt, Rinehart & Winston.
Proshansky, H.M., Ittelson, W.H., Rivlin, L.G. (1970). Environmental Psychology: Man and His Physical Setting. New York: Holt, Rinehart & Winston.
Proshansky, H.M., Ittelson, W.H., Rivlin, L.G. (1976). Environmental Psychology: People and Their Physical Settings, 2nd Edition. Oxford: Holt, Rinehart & Winston.
Rivlin, L.G., Wolfe, M. (1985). Institutional Settings in Children's Lives. New York: John Wiley & Sons.

Journal articles and book chapters
Ittelson, W.H., Proshansky, H.M., Rivlin, L.G. (1970). Bedroom size and social interaction of the psychiatric ward. Environment and Behavior, 2, 255–270.
Ittelson, W.H., Proshansky, H.M., Rivlin, L.G. (1970). The environmental psychology of the psychiatric ward. In Proshansky, H.M., Ittelson, W.H., Rivlin, L.G. (Eds.). Environmental Psychology: Man and His Physical Setting, pp. 419–439. New York: Holt, Rinehart & Winston.
Ittelson, W.H., Proshansky, H.M., Rivlin, L.G. (1970). The use of behavioral maps in environmental psychology. In Proshansky, H.M., Ittelson, W.H., Rivlin, L.G. (Eds.). Environmental Psychology: Man and His Physical Setting, pp. 658–668. New York: Holt, Rinehart & Winston.
Proshansky, H.M., Ittelson, W.H., Rivlin, L.G. (1972b). Freedom of choice and behavior in a physical setting. In Wohlwill, J.F., Carson, D.H. (Eds.). Environment and the Social Sciences: Perspectives and Applications, pp. 29–43. Washington, DC: American Psychological Association.
Rivlin, L.G. (1959). Creativity and the self-attitudes and sociability of high school students. Journal of Educational Psychology, 50(4), 147–152.
Rivlin, L.G. (1979). Understanding and evaluating therapeutic environments for children In Canter, D, Canter S. (Eds.). Designing for Therapeutic Environments: A review of Research, pp. 29–61. Chichester, England: John P. Wiley & Sons.
Rivlin, L.G. (1982). Group membership and place meanings in an urban neighborhood. Journal of Social Issues, 38(3), 75–93.
Rivlin, L.G. (1986). A new look at the homeless. Social Policy, 16(4), 3–10.
Rivlin, L.G. (1987). The neighborhood, personal identity, and group affiliation. In Altman, I., Wandersman, A. (Eds.). Neighborhood and Community Environments, pp. 1–34. New York: Plenum.
Rivlin, L.G. (1990a). Home and Homelessness in the Lives of Children. In Boxhill, N.A. (Ed.). Homeless Children: The Watchers and the Waiters, pp. xx. New York: Hawthorne Press.
Rivlin, L.G. (1990b). Paths towards environmental consciousness. In Altman, I., Christensen, K. (Eds.). Environment and Behavior Studies: Emergence of Intellectual Traditions, pp. 169–185. New York: Plenum.
Rivlin, L.G. (1990c). The significance of home and homelessness. Marriage & Family Review, 15(1/2), 39–56.
Rivlin, L.G. (1994). Public spaces and public life in urban areas. In Neary, S.J., Symes, M.S., Brown, F.E. (Eds.). The Urban Experience: A People-Environment Perspective, pp. 289–296. London: Taylor & Francis Group.
Rivlin, L.G. (2002). The ethical imperative. In Bechtel, R.B., Churchman, A. (Eds.). Handbook of Environmental Psychology, pp. 15–27. New York: John P. Wiley & Sons.
Rivlin, L.G. (2006). Found spaces: Freedom of choice in public life. In Franck, K.A., Stevens, Q. (Eds.). Loose Space: Diversity and Possibility in Urban Life, pp. 56–80. New York: Routledge.
Rivlin, L.G., Imbimbo, J.E. (1989). Self-help efforts in a squatter community: Implications for addressing contemporary homelessness. American Journal of Community Psychology, 17(6), 705–728.
Rivlin, L.G., Manzo, L.C (1988). Homeless children in New York City: A view from the Nineteenth century. Children's Environment Quarterly, 5(1), 26–33.
Rivlin, L.G., Moore, J. (2001). Home-making: Supports and barriers to the process of home. Journal of Social Distress and the Homeless, 10(4), 323–336.
Rivlin, L.G., Proshansky, H.M., Ittelson, W.H. (1969–70). Changes in psychiatric ward design and patient behavior. Transactions of the Bartlett Society, 8, 7-32.
Rivlin, L.G., Rothenberg, M., Justa, F., Wallis, A., Wheeler Jr., F.G. (1974). Children's conceptions of open classrooms through the use of scaled models. In Carson, D.H. (Ed.). Man-Environment Interactions: Evaluations and Applications. Washington, DC: Environmental Design Research Association.
Rivlin, L.G., Rothenberg, M. (1976). The use of space in open classrooms. In Proshansky, H.M., Ittelson, W.H., Rivlin, L.G. (Eds.). Environmental Psychology: People and Their Physical Settings, pp. 479–489. New York: Holt, Rinehart & Winston.
Rivlin, L.G., Weinstein, C.S. (1984). Educational issues, school settings, and environmental psychology. Journal of Environmental Psychology, 4(4), 347–364.
Rivlin, L.G., Wolfe, M. (1972). The early history of a psychiatric hospital for children: Expectations and reality. Environment and Behavior, 4, 33–72. [Also found in Environmental Psychology, 2nd Edition (1976) pp. 459–479]
Rivlin, L.G., Wolfe, M., Beyda, M. (1973). Age-related differences in the use of space in a children's psychiatric hospital. In Preiser, W. (Ed.). Environmental Design Research, Volume One, pp. 191–203. Stroudsburg, Pennsylvania: Dowden, Hutchinson and Ross.
Wolfe, M., Rivlin, L.G. (1987). The institutions in children's lives. In Weinstein, C.S., David, T.G. (Eds.). Space for Children: The Built Environment and Child's Development, pp. 89–114. New York: Plenum.

Book reviews
Rivlin, L.G. (1976). Book review: Alternative Learning Environments by C.J. Coates (Ed.). Journal of Architectural Research, 5, 38–39.
Rivlin, L.G. (184). Book review: Homelessness in America: A Forced March to Nowhere by M.E. Hombs & M. Snyder. Journal of Architectural and Planning Research, 2(1), 153-15x.
Rivlin, L.G. (1993). Book review: Silent Sisters: A Study of Homeless Women by B.G. Russell. Sex Roles, 28, xx.
Rivlin, L.G. (1994). Book review: The Women Outside: Meanings and Myths of Homelessness by S. Golden. Gender, Place and Culture, 1(1), 132–134.

External links
 CUNY Graduate Center Environmental Psychology PhD Program

Brooklyn College alumni
City University of New York faculty
Teachers College, Columbia University alumni
21st-century American psychologists
Environmental psychologists
Living people
1929 births
20th-century American psychologists